Kettil is a given name. Notable people with the name include:

Kettil Karlsson (Vasa) (1433–1465), Swedish clergyman and regent of Sweden under the Kalmar Union from February 1464 to August 1465
Kettil Runske, according to Olaus Magnus' Historia de Gentibus Septentrionalibus (1555), the man who brought runes to humankind
Kettil Trout, North Norwegian chieftain from Ramsta (Hrafnista) in Hålogaland, from Icelandic saga Kettil Hoeng or Ketils saga hœngs

See also
Kjetil